The 2001 Arizona Wildcats baseball team represented the University of Arizona during the 2001 NCAA Division I baseball season. The Wildcats played their home games at Frank Sancet Stadium. The team was coached by Jerry Stitt in his 5th season at Arizona. Following the season Coach Stitt resigned from his post after 23 seasons on the coaching staff, including the previous 5 as head coach. The Wildcats finished with an overall record of 33-23 and placed 5th in the Pacific-10 Conference with 12-12 record. They would miss the postseason for the 4th time in 5 years and 2nd straight season.

Previous season 
The Wildcats finished the 2000 season with an overall record of 26-30, their first losing season since 1996. They finished 5th in conference play with a record of 12-12. Arizona missed the postseason for a 2nd straight year and 4th time in Jerry Stitt's 5 seasons as head coach.

Personnel

Roster

Coaches

Opening day

Schedule and results

2001 MLB Draft

References 

Arizona
Arizona Wildcats baseball seasons
Arizona baseball